Serichonus is a monotypic genus of flowering plants belonging to the family Rhamnaceae. The only species is Serichonus gracilipes.

References

Rhamnaceae
Rhamnaceae genera
Monotypic Rosales genera